Henry Bailey may refer to:

People 
Henry Bailey (sport shooter) (1893–1972), American sport shooter
Henry Bailey (Canadian politician) (1818–1897), politician in Nova Scotia
Henry Bailey (American football) (born 1973), former American football wide receiver
Henry Bailey (Australian politician) (1876–1962), Australian politician
H. C. Bailey (Henry Christopher Bailey, 1878–1961), English author of detective fiction
Henry Hamilton Bailey (1894–1961), British surgeon
Henry Bailey (footballer) (1897–1965), English football goalkeeper

Other 
Henry Bailey (sternwheeler), an 1888 sternwheel steamboat that operated on Puget Sound

See also
Henry Bayley (1777–1844), English clergyman
Henry Baillie (1803–1885), British politician
Henry Baley (died 1701), ship's captain for the Hudson's Bay Company
Henry Bayle (1917–1991), French diplomat 
Henry Bayly (disambiguation)
Harry Bailey (disambiguation)

Bailey, Henry